Alexandre Roumat (born 27 June 1997) is a French rugby union player. His position is flanker and he currently plays for Toulouse in the Top 14.

Personal life
Roumat is the son of former French rugby union international Olivier Roumat.

References

External links
Stade Toulousain profile

1997 births
Living people
French rugby union players
Biarritz Olympique players
Union Bordeaux Bègles players
Stade Toulousain players
Rugby union flankers
Youth Olympic gold medalists for France
Rugby sevens players at the 2014 Summer Youth Olympics
Sportspeople from Landes (department)